Arne Preben Jensen (born 23 February 1932) is a Danish equestrian. He competed in two events at the 1960 Summer Olympics.

References

External links
 

1932 births
Living people
Danish male equestrians
Olympic equestrians of Denmark
Equestrians at the 1960 Summer Olympics
Sportspeople from Copenhagen